Singhapala (Baybayin: , , , Old Malay: Kota Singapura) was an ancient fortified city or a region, the capital of the Indianized Rajahnate of Cebu. The location of this ancient city is what is now the modern Barangay Mabolo in the northern district of Cebu City. Founded by Sri Lumay or Raja Muda Lumaya, a half-Tamil prince.

Background

Etymology

The name Singhapaha comes from Sanskrit word via Orang Keling Singama (சிங்கம்)  become  Singa in Old Malay which means (Lion), and Puram (புரம்) (Town or a City) which become Pura in Old Malay and then Pala in Philippine languages,  it's  variation of the sanskritized Singa-Puram,  Singapura  literally means "Lion city"  from Singapur (சிங்கப்பூர்), the same root name of the country of Singapore.

Location

The location of ancient Singhapala was said to be in what is now the currently part of the Northern district in modern-day barangay Mabolo in Cebu City, with estimated population of 21,842 in 2010. while the modern Cebu City where  comprises 80 barangays. These are grouped into two congressional districts, with 46 barangays in the northern district and 34 in the southern district.

As a trading center
During Rajah Humabon's reign, the region had since become an important trading center where agricultural products were bartered. From Japan, perfume and glass utensils were usually traded for native goods. Ivory products, leather, precious and semi-precious stones and śarkarā(Sarkarai in Tamil) (sugar) mostly came from India traders and Burmese people traders.   The harbors of Sugbu and the capital Singhapala became known colloquially as sinibuayng hingpit ("the place for trading"), shortened to sibu or sibo ("to trade"), from which the modern Castilian name "Cebú" originates. It was also during Humabon's reign that Lapu-Lapu arrived from Borneo, and was granted by Humabon the region of Mandawili (now Mandaue), including the island known as Opong or Opon (later known as Mactan). First contact with the Spanish also occurred during Humabon's reign, resulting in the death of Ferdinand Magellan.

Foundation

According to Aginid, Bayok sa atong Tawarik, a Visayan folk story, prior to the coming of the Spanish conquistadores, rajahnate was the common form of state or government of Cebu island. This rajahnate was established by Sri Lumay (c. 1400 CE.), who was a prince of Chola Dynasty who settled in Cebu with his son, Sri Alho, they ruled the south known as Sialo which included Valladolid, Carcar, up to Santander.

Mention in Magellan's expedition
Antonio Pigafetta, the expedition scribe of the Magellan Expedition, enumerated the towns and dependencies in the Rajahnate of Cebu and Singhapala was even mentioned albeit mispronounced as Cingapola.

During the Spanish period

Singhapala might continued to exist until 1565, when the Rajahnate was dissolved during the reign of Rajah Tupas by the forces of conquistador Miguel López de Legazpi in the battle of Cebu. Singhapala and the areas which is now composed of the modern Cebu City has incorporated in Spanish rule, and Miguel López de Legazpi 's party named the new city Villa de San Miguel de Cebú (later renamed "Ciudad del Santísimo Nombre de Jesús)." In 1567, the Cebu garrison was reinforced with the arrival of 2,100 soldiers from New Spain (Mexico). The growing colony was then fortified by Fort San Pedro.

See also
 Rajah Humabon
 Lapu-Lapu
 Ferdinand Magellan
 Miguel López de Legazpi
 Sri Lumay - founder of Rajahnate of Cebu.
 Sinhapura
 Rajahnate of Cebu 
 Kedatuan of Madja-as
 Cebu City
 Cebu
 History of the Philippines (900-1521)
 Chola Dynasty

References

External links
 http://www.cebu-bluewaters.com/early-cebu-history.html
 https://thebulwaganfoundation.wordpress.com/

Capitals in Asia
Archaeological sites in the Philippines
Barangay states
History of the Philippines (900–1565)
History of Cebu